Desmond Lawrence Christian (9 September 1923 – 30 August 1977) was a New Zealand rugby union player and coach. A number 8 and prop, Christian represented Auckland at a provincial level, and was a member of the New Zealand national side, the All Blacks, on their 1949 tour of South Africa. He played 11 matches for the All Blacks on that tour, including one international. He later coached the Horowhenua representative team, and was a selector for the North Island (1963–69) and national (1964–66) sides.

References

1923 births
1977 deaths
People from Auckland
New Zealand rugby union players
New Zealand international rugby union players
Auckland rugby union players
Rugby union props
Rugby union number eights
New Zealand rugby union coaches